Pinnacle (formerly West Riding House) is an  and 20 storey tall office building in Leeds, West Yorkshire, England, which was completed in 1973. It was the tallest building in the city until 2005 with the construction of Bridgewater Place.

There are retail units on the ground floor of the building; it is located in the centre of the shopping district of the city. It was internally renovated in the early 2000s followed by a refurbishment of the lower floor retail space. Leeds City Council were originally the main tenants in the building but have since vacated their offices there. The building has a small multi-storey car park off Upper Basinghall Street to the rear. Until the 2000s the building stood out on the Leeds skyline, but the construction of taller buildings (including ones on higher ground than Pinnacle) have lessened its prominence.

There is also a smaller West Riding House opposite Forster Square railway station in neighbouring Bradford.

Albion Zion Chapel, later St. James' Chapel, was formerly at this location: see List of places of worship in the City of Leeds#City Centre 3.

Gallery

See also
Architecture of Leeds
List of tallest buildings in Leeds
Trinity Leeds

External links

SkyscraperNews entry
Pinnacle Leeds Website

Office buildings completed in 1973
Skyscrapers in Leeds
Skyscraper office buildings in England